Yun Myung-chan (1949–17 December 2017) was a North Korean footballer and football manager.

Early life
Born in Pyongyang in 1949, Yun and his brother were raised by his mother after his father defected to South Korea in 1950 during the Korean War.

Playing career
In 1964, after graduating high school, Yun joined February 8 Sports Club. He went on to represent the North Korea national football team from 1968 until his retirement in 1976.

Managerial career
Yun served as interim manager of the North Korea national football team between 1992 and 1993.

Defection, later life and death
In January 1992, Yun found that his cousin had been living in Hawaii, and asked her to bring his father to China. In July of the same year, on his return from the 1992 AFC U-16 Championship in Saudi Arabia, Yun met with his father in a restaurant in Beijing. By July 1998, North Korean authorities had found out that Yun was in contact with his father, and Yun escaped to China via the Tumen River, leaving his wife and four children behind. He relocated to South Korea in April 1999, and in July and October of the same year, three of his children tried to also flee North Korea, however, his youngest son was caught and returned to The North.

Following his defection to South Korea, Yun worked as a member of the K League, before running a restaurant in Daegu.

Yun died on 8 December 2017 in Seoul.

References

1949 births
2017 deaths
Living people
North Korean defectors
North Korean footballers
North Korea international footballers
North Korean football managers
North Korea national football team managers
Association football defenders
April 25 Sports Club players